Observation Tower at Goetzinger's Height is a 25 metres tall observation tower on Goetzinger's Height (Götzingerhöhe), a small mountain near Neustadt in Sachsen, which is named after Wilhelm Leberecht Götzinger. 

Observation Tower at Goetzinger's Height was built in 1883 together with an inn in its proximity. Therefore, it is older than Eiffel Tower and one of the oldest lattice towers in the world. In 1992 the observation tower, from which you have a nice view on Elbe Sandstone Mountains, Ore Mountains and Lusatian Highlands was renovated. The inn, situated close to the tower was closed for a longer period and reopened on April 1st, 2006.

External links
 https://www.goetzinger-hoehe.de/aussicht-neustadt-saechsische-schweiz.html

See also
 List of towers

Observation towers in Saxony
1883 establishments in Germany
Buildings and structures in Saxony
Mountains of Saxony
Neustadt in Sachsen